José Antonio Duran (born 17 January 1946) is a Mexican boxer. He competed at the 1964 Summer Olympics and the 1968 Summer Olympics. At the 1964 Summer Olympics in Tokyo, he defeated Youssef Anwer and Seok Jong-gu, before losing to Charles Brown.

References

External links
 

1946 births
Living people
Mexican male boxers
Olympic boxers of Mexico
Boxers at the 1964 Summer Olympics
Boxers at the 1968 Summer Olympics
Sportspeople from Durango
Featherweight boxers